Oondees or undees are a breakfast delicacy from the Mangalore region of India. They are made of semolina or rice, spherical shaped and about 4 inches in diameter and have a semi-soft texture.  They may be sweetened by adding sugar or coconut.

Preparation
Oondees were traditionally made by soaking and flattening rice by pounding on it. However, in modern times ready-made idli rava is used instead. They are prepared by cooking boiling rava (semolina) with coconut, sugar, salt and traditional spices until it becomes semi-hard. The mass is shaped into spheres about four inches in diameter and steamed.

External links
 Steamed oondees at AmchiRecipes.com

Karnataka cuisine
Mangalorean cuisine
Konkani cuisine